Edward E. Swanstrom (March 20, 1903 - August 10, 1985) was Titular Bishop of Arba and Auxiliary Bishop of New York.

Biography
Born in New York City to Gustave and Mary (Cronin) Swanstrom, Swanstrom graduated from Fordham University with a B.A. in 1924. While at Fordham he was a member of the varsity track team, captaining it his senior year. He studied for the priesthood at St. John's Seminary in Brooklyn and was ordained a priest of the Diocese of Brooklyn on June 2, 1928. Fr. Swanstrom earned a diploma from the New York School of Social Work (now Columbia University School of Social Work) in 1933 and a Ph.D. from Fordham in 1938. His doctoral dissertation concerned the problems of waterfront laborers in Brooklyn.

Swanstrom was curate at St. James Pro-Cathedral in Brooklyn from 1934 to 1960. He took on additional responsibilities as assistant diocesan director of Catholic Charities from 1933 to 1943, assistant executive director of Catholic Relief Services from 1943 to 1947, and finally as executive director of CRS from 1947 to 1976. Catholic Relief Services was originally intended as a temporary effort of the U.S. bishops to assist World War II refugees and POWs, but by 1955 the organization became permanent, and assisted victims of natural disasters as well as victims of war. In its earlier years, CRS concentrated on resettling refugees and sending supplies of food, clothing, and medicine to areas of need. Later, CRS began efforts to foster economic development in the areas it serves, particularly in the Third World.

During his tenure at CRS, his offices at the Empire State Building were among those destroyed when a B-25 Mitchell bomber accidentally crashed into the building. He was not there when the incident happened, but his secretary was among those killed.

In 1960, Swanstrom was appointed auxiliary bishop of New York by Pope John XXIII. He also served as pastor of St. Andrew's Church in New York City from 1965 to 1973 while remaining executive director of Catholic Relief Services.

With American involvement in the Vietnam War, CRS began substantial operations in southeast Asia. Swanstrom and CRS were heavily criticized by the Catholic Peace Fellowship for concentrating their efforts in South Vietnam. In 1967, it was alleged by the CPF that CRS' single largest food distribution program was being used by the U.S. and South Vietnamese governments as a pay program for South Vietnamese militiamen and their families. If so, said the CPF, Catholic Relief Services was merely an agent of American governmental policy rather than an impartial provider of needed services to the people of Vietnam. Bishop Swanstrom replied that aid to North Vietnam was probably against U.S. law, and that there was no assurance that CRS aid would not be used for military purposes. He made several trips to Vietnam from 1956 to 1968 to oversee CRS operations there.

Bishop Swanstrom retired on March 20, 1978 and lived in New York City until his death in 1985. He held honorary degrees from Catholic University, Iona College, and St. John's University. He was named an assistant at the papal throne in 1977. He was the author of two books: "The Waterfront Labor Problem: A Study in Decasualization and Unemployment Insurance" (1938 dissertation), and "Pilgrims of the Night: A Study of Expelled Peoples" (1950).

References

External links
 Bishop Edward Swanstrom; Directed Catholic Aid Group (August 14, 1985)
Catholic Relief Services Website

Participants in the Second Vatican Council
20th-century American Roman Catholic titular bishops
People of the Roman Catholic Archdiocese of New York
Fordham University alumni
Columbia University School of Social Work alumni
1903 births
1985 deaths
Religious leaders from New York (state)
Commanders Crosses of the Order of Merit of the Federal Republic of Germany